Yamoussoukro Department is a department of Ivory Coast. The department houses the political capital of Ivory Coast, Yamoussoukro, and is one of two departments in the Yamoussoukro Autonomous District.

Population and sub-prefectures
In the 2014 census, Yamoussoukro Department had a population of 310,056. The department is divided into two sub-prefectures, Yamoussoukro and Kossou.

History

Yamoussoukro Department was established in 1988 as first-level subdivision by dividing Bouaké Department. In 1997, regions were introduced as new first-level subdivisions of Ivory Coast; as a result, all departments were converted into second-level subdivisions. Yamoussoukro Department was included in Lacs Region.

In 1998, Yamoussoukro Department was divided in order to create Tiébissou Department. Yamoussoukro Department was divided again in 2009 to create Attiégouakro Department.

In 2011, districts were introduced as new first-level subdivisions of Ivory Coast. At the same time, regions were reorganised and became second-level subdivisions and all departments were converted into third-level subdivisions. At this time, Yamoussoukro Department became part of Yamoussoukro Autonomous District, one of two districts in the country with no regions.

Notes

Departments of Yamoussoukro
1988 establishments in Ivory Coast
States and territories established in 1988